Bugs may refer to:

 Plural of bug

Arts, entertainment and media

Fictional characters
 Bugs Bunny, a character
 Bugs Meany, a character in the Encyclopedia Brown books

Films
 Bugs (2003 film), a science-fiction-horror film
 Bugs (2014 film), a science fiction disaster thriller film

Television
 Bugs (TV series), a UK television series from the 1990s
 Bugs!, an American animated series, also known as Wabbit
 "Bugs" (Supernatural), an episode of the television series Supernatural
 "Bugs", an episode of Blue's Clues

Other media
 "Bugs" (Pearl Jam song), a Pearl Jam song from the album Vitalogy
 Bugs (Theodore Roszak), a novel
 Bugs! (streaming service), often stylized as SUPER SOUND Bugs!, a South Korean subscription digital streaming service

Other uses
 Bugs (nickname)
 Bayesian inference using Gibbs sampling, a software package
 Birmingham University Guild of Students, the former name of the University of Birmingham Guild of Students

See also
 Bug (disambiguation)
 Bugsy (disambiguation)
 Bugz, a former member of the rap group D-12